The Star of Lakshmi is a special octagram, a regular compound polygon, represented by Schläfli symbol {8/2} or 2{4}, made from two congruent squares with the same center at 45° angles, and figures in Hinduism, commonly misattributed to Ashtalakshmi (lit. Eightfold Lakshmi), the eight forms, or "kinds of wealth", of the goddess Lakshmi due to being called so in The Return of the Pink Panther .

In popular culture
The figure was popularized by The Return of the Pink Panther where it is featured with the same name in the Lugash national museum portrayed in the movie.
An eight-pointed star logo has been used by the band Faith No More, although the creator said it was an homage to the Symbol of Chaos.

See also
 Star of Ishtar
 Rub El Hizb – Islamic character
 Surya Majapahit – Used during Majapahit times to represent the gods of the directions
 Kagome crest - can be either a 6-pointed star and an 8-pointed star.

References

External links

Hindu symbols
Star symbols

es:Estrella tartésica